CSGN can mean:

 Cyber Sports Gaming Network; An online gaming community/network for semi professional gamers.
 The stock ticker symbol for Credit Suisse on the SWX Swiss Stock Exchange
 Cruiser Strike Guided-missile Nuclear – the US Navy's strike cruiser proposal 
 Sign function for real and complex expressions